Aṭṭhakathā (Pali for explanation, commentary) refers to Pali-language Theravadin Buddhist commentaries to the canonical Theravadin Tipitaka. These commentaries give the traditional interpretations of the scriptures. The major commentaries were based on earlier ones, now lost, in Prakrit and Sinhala, which were written down at the same time as the Canon, in the last century BCE. Some material in the commentaries is found in canonical texts of other schools of Buddhism, suggesting an early common source.

According to K.R. Norman: There is no direct evidence that any commentarial material was in  fact recited at the first council, but there is clear evidence that some parts of the commentaries are very old, perhaps even going back to the time of the Buddha, because they afford parallels with  texts which are regarded as canonical by other sects, and must therefore pre-date the schisms between the sects. As has already been noted, some canonical texts include commentarial passages, while the existence of the Old Commentary in the Vinaya-pitaka and the canonical status of the Niddesa prove that some sort of exegesis was felt to be needed at a very early stage of Buddhism. As with the Canon itself, the contents of collected editions of the Theravadin commentaries, compiled from the fourth century CE onwards, vary between editions. The minimal collection, found in the Thai edition (1992) includes the following (Skilling 2002).
 Twelve commentaries ascribed to Buddhaghosa:  commentary on the Vinaya Pitaka; commentary on the Sutta Pitaka :- one each on the Digha Nikaya, Majjhima Nikaya, Samyutta Nikaya and Anguttara Nikaya; four on Khuddaka Nikaya books; and three on the Abhidhamma Pitaka.
 Commentaries by Dhammapala on seven books of the Khuddaka Nikaya.
 Four commentaries by various authors on four other books of the Khuddaka Nikaya.
In addition, the following are included in one or both of the other two editions: the Burmese Chatthasangayana edition (a list of contents can be found in Thein Han 1981) and the Sinhalese Simon Hewavitarne Bequest edition.
 Buddhaghosa's Visuddhimagga, a systematic presentation of the traditional teaching; the commentaries on the first four nikayas refer to this for the material it details. In both Sinhalese (Mori et al. 1994) and Burmese
 The Patimokkha (Pruitt & Norman 2001, page xxxvi) and its commentary Kankhavitarani, ascribed to Buddhaghosa
 Commentary by Dhammapala on the Nettipakarana, a work sometimes included in the canon
 Vinayasangaha, a selection of passages from Samantapasadika arranged topically by Sariputta in the twelfth century (Crosby 2006)
 Saratthasamuccaya, commentary on the Paritta. In Sinhalese (Malalasekera 1938).

Buddhaghosa 

Below is a listing of fourth- or fifth-century CE commentator Buddhaghosa's fourteen alleged commentaries (Pāli: atthakatha) on the Pāli Tipitaka (Norman 1983).

Only the Visuddhimagga and the commentaries on the first four nikayas are accepted by a consensus of scholars as Buddhaghosa's.

Dhammapala 
The commentator Dhammapala's date is uncertain. He wrote after Buddhaghosa, and probably no later than the 7th century. His Khuddaka Nikaya commentaries are Paramatthadipani comprising
 Udana-atthakatha regarding the Udana.
 Itivuttaka-atthakatha regarding the Itivuttaka.
 Vimanavatthu-atthakatha regarding the Vimanavatthu.
 Petavatthu-atthakatha regarding the Petavatthu.
 Theragatha-atthakatha regarding the Theragatha.
 Therigatha-atthakatha regarding the Therigatha.
 Cariyapitaka-atthakatha regarding the Cariyapitaka.

Other Khuddaka Nikaya commentaries 

Other Khuddaka Nikaya commentaries are
 Saddhammapajotika by Upasena regarding the Niddesa.
 Saddhammappakasini by Mahanama regarding the Patisambhidamagga.
 Visuddhajanavilasini by an unknown author regarding the Apadana.
 Madhuratthavilasini attributed to Buddhadatta regarding the Buddhavamsa.

Three books are included in some editions of the Khuddaka Nikaya: Nettipakarana, Petakopadesa and Milindapañha. Of these only the Nettipakarana has a commentary in any standard edition.

Translations 

 Visuddhimagga
The Path of Purity, tr Pe Maung Tin, 1923–31, 3 volumes; reprinted in 1 volume, Pali Text Society, Oxford
 The Path of Purification, tr Nanamoli, Ananda Semage, Colombo, 1956; reprinted Buddhist Publication Society, Kandy, Sri Lanka. Available for free download here
 Samantapasadika
 Introduction translated as "The inception of discipline" by N. A. Jayawickrama, in 1 volume with the Pali, "Vinaya nidana", 1962, PTS, Oxford
 Chinese adaptation called Shan chien p'i p'o sha tr P. V. Bapat & Akira Hirakawa, Bhandarkar Oriental Research Institute, Poona
 Patimokkha tr K. R. Norman, 2001, PTS, Oxford
 Kankhavitarani: translation by K. R. Norman & William Pruitt in preparation
 Sumangalavilasini (parts)
 Introduction translated in a learned journal in the 1830s
 Commentary on Brahmajala Sutta, abr tr Bodhi in The All-Embracing Net of Views, BPS, Kandy, 1978. Available for free download here
 Commentary on Samannaphala Sutta, abr tr Bodhi in The Discourse on the Fruits of Recluseship, BPS, Kandy, 1989. Available for free download here
 Commentary on Maha Nidana Sutta, abr tr Bodhi in The Great Discourse on Causation, BPS, Kandy, 1984. Available for free download here
 Commentary on Mahaparinibbana Sutta tr Yang-Gyu An, 2003, PTS, Oxford
 Papancasudani (parts)
 Commentary on Mulapariyaya Sutta, abr tr Bodhi in The Discourse on the Root of Existence, BPS, Kandy, 1980. Available for free download here
 Commentary on Sammaditthi Sutta, tr Nanamoli in The Discourse on Right View, BPS, Kandy, 1991. Available for free download here
 Commentary on Satipatthana Sutta, tr Soma in The Way of Mindfulness, Saccanubodha Samiti, Kandy, 1941; reprinted BPS, Kandy. Available for free download @here
 Manorathapurani (parts): stories of leading nuns and laywomen, tr Mabel Bode in Journal of the Royal Asiatic Society, new series, volume XXV, pages 517-66 & 763-98
 Paramatthajotika on Khuddakapatha, tr Nanamoli as "The illustrator of ultimate meaning", in 1 volume with "The minor readings" (Khuddakapatha), 1960, PTS, Oxford
 Dhammapada commentary, translated in two parts
 Stories giving background to verses, tr E. W. Burlingame as Buddhist Legends, 1921, 3 volumes, Harvard Oriental Series; reprinted PTS, Oxford
 Explanations of verses, translated in the Dhammapada translation by John Ross Carter & Mahinda Palihawadana, Oxford University Press, 1987; included only in the hardback edition, not the paperback World Classics edition
 Udana commentary tr Peter Masefield, 1994-5, 2 volumes, PTS, Oxford
 Itivuttaka commentary tr Peter Masefield, 2008–2009, 2 vols., PTS, Oxford
 Vimanavatthu commentary, tr Peter Masefield as Vimana Stories, 1989, PTS, Oxford
 Petavatthu commentary, tr U Ba Kyaw & Peter Masefield as Peta-Stories, 1980, PTS, Oxford
 Theragatha commentary: substantial extracts translated in Psalms of the Brethren, tr C. A. F. Rhys Davids, 1913; reprinted in Psalms of the Early Buddhists, PTS, Oxford
 Therigatha commentary, tr as The Commentary on the Verses of the Theris, by William Pruitt, 1998, PTS, Oxford
 Jataka commentary
 Introduction tr as The Story of Gotama Buddha by N. A. Jayawickrama, 1990, PTS, Oxford
 Most of the rest is translated in the Jataka translation by E. B. Cowell et al., 1895–1907, 6 volumes, Cambridge University Press; reprinted in 3 volumes by PTS, Oxford
 Madhuratthavilasini, tr as The Clarifier of the Sweet Meanlng by I. B. Horner, 1978, PTS, Oxford
 Atthasalini, tr as The Expositor by Pe Maung Tin, 1920–21, 2 volumes; reprinted in 1 volume, PTS, Oxford
 Sammohavinodani, tr as The Dispeller of Delusion, by Nanamoli, 1987–91, 2 volumes, PTS, Oxford
 Kathavatthu commentary, tr as The Debates Commentary by B. C. Law, 1940, PTS, Oxford

See also 
 Anupiṭaka
 Buddhaghosa
 Dhammapala
 List of Pali Canon anthologies
 Pali Canon
 Pali literature
 Subcommentaries, Theravada
 Tripiṭaka

Notes

Sources 

 Crosby, Kate (2006). In Journal of the Pali Text Society, volume XXVIII.
 Hinüber, Oskar von (1996). Handbook of Pali Literature. Berlin: Walter de Gruyter. .
 Malalasekera, G.P. (1938). Dictionary of Pali Proper Names, volume II. London: John Murray for the Government of India. .
 Mori, Sodo, Y Karunadasa & Toshiichi Endo (1994). Pali Atthakatha Correspondence Table. Oxford: Pali Text Society.
 Norman, K.R. (1983). Pali Literature, Wiesbaden: Otto Harrassowitz.
 Pruitt, William & K.R. Norman (2001). The Patimokkha, Oxford, Pali Text Society
 Rhys Davids, T.W. & William Stede (eds.) (1921-5). The Pali Text Society’s Pali–English Dictionary. Chipstead: Pali Text Society. A general on-line search engine for the PED is available at http://dsal.uchicago.edu/dictionaries/pali/. Accessed 2007-05-09.
 Skilling, Peter (2002). In Journal of the Pali Text Society, volume XXVII.
 Thein Han, U (1981). In The Light of the Dhamma.

External links 

 Bullitt, John T. (2002). Beyond the Tipitaka: A Field Guide to Post-canonical Pali Literature.  Retrieved on 2007-05-09 from "Access to Insight".
 The Path of Purification, Translated from the Pali by Bhikkhu Nanamoli – complete pdf.
 The Discourse on Right View: The Sammaditthi Sutta and its Commentary